Golden Butterfly is a 2021 Tunisian drama film directed by Abdelhamid Bouchnak. It was selected as the Tunisian entry for the Best International Feature Film at the 94th Academy Awards.

See also
 List of submissions to the 94th Academy Awards for Best International Feature Film
 List of Tunisian submissions for the Academy Award for Best International Feature Film

References

External links
 

2021 films
2021 drama films
Tunisian drama films
2020s Arabic-language films
2020s French-language films
Tunisian multilingual films